Marco Pasiciel (born 26 July 1989) is a German former footballer who played as a midfielder.

Career
Pasiciel made his professional debut for SpVgg Unterhaching in the 3. Liga on 25 July 2009, coming on as a substitute in the 80th minute for Leandro Grech in the 3–3 home draw against SV Sandhausen.

References

External links
 
 
 TSV Brunnthal information at BFV.de 
 TSV Ottobrunn statistics at BFV.de 

1989 births
Living people
Footballers from Munich
German footballers
German football managers
German people of Polish descent
Association football midfielders
SpVgg Unterhaching players
SpVgg Unterhaching II players
3. Liga players
Regionalliga players